Steeplejack is the name of three fictional characters appearing in American comic books published by Marvel Comics.

Publication history
The first Steeplejack, Jake Mallard, appeared in Luke Cage, Power Man #18 (April 1974), and was created by Len Wein and George Tuska.

Maxwell Plumm first appeared in Luke Cage, Power Man #18 (April 1974), and was created by Len Wein and George Tuska. He first appeared as the second Steeplejack in Ms. Marvel #14 (February 1978), by Chris Claremont and Carmine Infantino. The character subsequently appears in Captain America #319 (July 1986), in which he was killed by the Scourge of the Underworld.

Fictional character biography

Jake Mallard

Jack Mallard was the first criminal to go by the name Steeplejack. He was a construction worker, and he and his two brothers were employed by contractor Maxwell Plumm. As Plumm unethically cut corners and safety and materials, Mallard's two brothers fell to their deaths when a girder slipped its cable in a sudden wind. He blamed Plumm and vowed vengeance, becoming the first Steeplejack. He attacked Plumm and was about to hurl him to his death from a construction site, when Power Man intervened. Steeplejack fought Cage, and then hurled Plumm from the building, and fled. Cage saved Plumm, who swiftly agreed to hire Cage for protection.

That night, Steeplejack returned to the construction site to sabotage it, and Power Man emerged from hiding to battle Steeplejack. During the fight, Steeplejack fell on one of the girders he had weakened, and it gave with the impact. Mallard plunged several stories towards the street, and the impact caused his fuel tanks to explode, apparently killing him.

Maxwell Plumm

Maxwell Plumm took the designs and outfit of the first Steeplejack. He fought Ms. Marvel and lost. He attended the final bash at the "Bar With No Name," and was shot to death by the Scourge of the Underworld.

Unnamed criminal
Roderick Kingsley later sold the Steeplejack gear to an unknown criminal. Steeplejack, Ringer, and Tumbler are shown to be in the services of Roderick Kinglsley. They were later ambushed by the Goblin King's servants Menace and Monster (the "Goblin" form of Carlie Cooper). Steeplejack is killed by Goblin Knight.

Equipment
Steeplejack's body suit offers protection from physical attacks. His multipurpose acetylene gun could fire force blasts, energy blasts, a wire slipknot, and heat and light.

References

External links
 
 

Characters created by Carmine Infantino
Characters created by Chris Claremont
Characters created by George Tuska
Characters created by Len Wein
Comics characters introduced in 1974
Comics characters introduced in 1978
Marvel Comics supervillains